Coenagriocnemis is a genus of damselfly in the family Coenagrionidae. The whole genus is  endemic to the Mascarene Islands.

The genus contains the following species:
Coenagriocnemis insulare 
Coenagriocnemis ramburi 
Coenagriocnemis reuniense 
Coenagriocnemis rufipes

References

Coenagrionidae
Zygoptera genera
Taxa named by Frederic Charles Fraser
Taxonomy articles created by Polbot